Puklo srce (English translation: My Heart Exploded) is the second studio album by Montenegrin singer Boban Rajović. It was released in 2003.

Track listing
Puklo srce (My Heart Exploded)
Papreno (Peppery)
Jesen je (It's Autumn)
Sad si s njim (Now You're with Him)
Bila si moj nemir (You Were My Unrest)
Vratiću se ja (I'll Return)
Igraj (Dance)
Karta za Raj (Ticket for Paradise)
Alkoholne injekcije (Alcohol Injections)
Samo pozovi (Just Call)
Dukati (Ducats)
Ruže daješ u pelinu (You Give Roses in Wormwood)

External links
Boban Rajović's discography, with the full album freely available for online listening

2003 albums
Boban Rajović albums